Popstars is the first album by Italian girl group Lollipop, released on June 1, 2001 by WEA Records / Warner Music Italy. It peaked at #14 on the Italian album chart and produced three singles, including the Italian #1 single "Down Down Down", "Don't Leave Me Now" and "When The Rain".

Track listing

Charts
Album 

The album sold nearly 100,000 copies, a very good result for the Italian music market.

Singles

References

2001 debut albums
Lollipop (Italian band) albums